, commonly translated as “(military) governor,” “protector,” or “constable,” was a title given to certain officials in feudal Japan. They were each appointed by the shōgun to oversee one or more of the provinces of Japan. The position gave way to the emergence of the daimyōs (大名, feudal lords) in the late 15th century, as shugo began to claim power over lands themselves, rather than serving simply as governors on behalf of the shogunate.

The post is said to have been created in 1185 by Minamoto no Yoritomo to aid the capture of Yoshitsune, with the additional motivation of extending the rule of the shogunate government throughout Japan. The shugo (military governors) progressively supplanted the existing kokushi (civil governors), who were appointed by the Imperial Court in Kyoto. Officially, the gokenin in each province were supposed to serve the shugo, but in practice, the relationship between them was fragile, as the gokenin were vassals of the shōgun as well.

Shugo often stayed for long periods in the capital, far from their province, and were sometimes appointed shugo for several provinces at the same time. In such cases, a deputy shugo, or shugodai (守護代), was appointed.

Over time, the powers of some shugo grew considerably. Around the time of the Ōnin War (1467–1477), conflicts between shugo became common. Some shugo lost their powers to subordinates such as the shugodai, while others strengthened their grip on their territories. As a result, at the end of the 15th century, the beginning of the Sengoku period, the power in the country was divided amongst lords of various kinds (shugo, shugodai, and others), who came to be called daimyōs.

Famous shugo and daimyō clans of the Muromachi period 
Below is a list of some of the major clans that produced shugos and daimyōs during the Muromachi period, as well as the regions over which they ruled.
 Hosokawa clan – Izumi, Settsu, Tanba, Bitchū, Awaji, Awa, Sanuki, Iyo, and Tosa provinces
 Takeda clan – Kai Province , Aki province , Wakasa Province
 Ōtomo clan – Bungo Province , Buzen Province
 Toki clan – Mino Province 
 Rokkaku clan – Ōmi Province
 Ogasawara clan – Shinano Province

References

Japanese words and phrases

Further reading
 Frédéric, Louis (2002). Japan Encyclopedia. Cambridge, Massachusetts: Harvard University Press.

Government of feudal Japan